Sandra Erlingsdóttir (born 27 July 1998) is an Icelandic handball player and a member of the Icelandic national team. In 2019 she won the Icelandic championship and the Icelandic Cup as a member of Valur.

Handball
Sandra played her first senior team matches with Füchse Berlin during the 2015–2016 season. She spent the next two seasons with ÍBV before moving to Valur in 2018.

Titles 
Úrvalsdeild kvenna:
Winner (1): 2019
 Icelandic Cup:
 Winner (1): 2019

Football
Sandra debuted for the ÍBV women's football team in 2013, appearing in two matches in the top-tier Úrvalsdeild kvenna and in one Icelandic Cup match.

Personal life
Sandra was born in 1998 to Erlingur Richardsson, a handball coach and former player, and Vigdís Sigurðardóttir, a former player for the Icelandic national team.

Referencer

External links
Profile at eurohandball.com

1998 births
Living people
Sandra Erlingsdottir
Sandra Erlingsdottir
Sandra Erlingsdottir
21st-century Icelandic women